Avani Bharat Kumar Panchal (born 31 August 1991) is an Indian Roller Skate Athlete from Vishakapatnam, Andhra Pradesh. She won a bronze medal at 2010 Asian Games held in Guangzhou, China in Pairs Skating with her partner Anup Kumar Yama.

Education
Avani has a Bachelor of Technology(B.Tech) degree from Andhra University. She studied Computer Science and Engineering in Anil Neerukonda Institute of Technology and Sciences (ANITS), Sangivalasa in Vishakapatnam. She graduated in 2013.

References

Living people
1991 births
Sportspeople from Visakhapatnam
Sportswomen from Andhra Pradesh
Asian Games medalists in roller sports
Roller skaters at the 2010 Asian Games
Indian roller skaters
Asian Games bronze medalists for India
Medalists at the 2010 Asian Games
Andhra University alumni